Cranz is a German surname. Notable people with the surname include:

 Christl Cranz (1914–2004), German skier
 Cynthia Cranz (born 1969), American voice actress
 Friedrich-Carl Cranz (1886–1941), General of the Wehrmacht  during World War II
 Galen Cranz, professor of architecture at the University of California, Berkeley
 Rudolf Cranz (1918–1941), German skier

German-language surnames